The Canadian Rugby Championship (CRC) was a Canadian amateur rugby union competition, partially funded by the World Rugby. It was the highest level of men's domestic rugby in Canada. Four representative teams from regions across Canada competed for the MacTier Cup. The CRC was started in 2009 by Rugby Canada and was held annually from August to September. Rugby Canada also held CRC tournaments for under-19 men, under-20 women, and senior women.

History

The North America 4

In 2006, the IRB started the North America 4 (NA4), to help create a higher level of rugby in North America, as well as to develop players and provide a pathway to national team selection and to make North American rugby teams more competitive at international level. It was contested by four teams, two each from Canada and the USA.

The American Rugby Championship

On September 7, 2009 the IRB scrapped the NA4 and unveiled the ARC competition, in which Canada, the USA and Argentina would send representative teams to play for a championship title (Tonga was later added in the second season, replaced with Uruguay from 2012 onwards) 

In order to select a team that would play in the ARC, Rugby Canada unveiled the CRC, with the champion and runner-up advancing to the ARC. The BC Bears Coached by Mike James and Kris de Scossa were inaugural champions, who went on to play Argentina Jaguars, Russia and England Counties. Following the first season, a Canada Selects team was chosen by Team Canada coach Kieran Crowley instead, exclusively from players who competed in the CRC.

The CRC
In the inaugural 2009 season, six games were played in a round-robin format, similar to that of The Rugby Championship, with the team collecting the most points over the season being named champions.  

The following season, the same six game season was used, however a post-season was added—with the top two teams squaring off in a final at the home venue of the team which amassed the most points during the regular season.

In 2011 the format changed yet again, scrapping the final and instead going back to a round-robin competition. This time with ten games, each team playing five. The western teams (the BC Bears and the Prairie Wolf Pack) played three home games and two away games, while this schedule was reversed for the two eastern teams, (the Ontario Blues and the Atlantic Rock). In 2012, this was switched, having the western teams play two home games and three away games, with the eastern teams playing the opposite.

Season structure
The CRC is broken up into a pre-season and a round robin season, with no postseason. During the pre-season teams play exhibition matches against other teams, usually not participating in the CRC. The pre-season is not a formal one set by the league, but instead the individual teams can play club or touring sides at their own leisure, or may choose to not play any pre-season games at all.

Starting in mid August, and ending late September, the regular season follows the same format as The Rugby Championship, having teams playing in a round robin format, with the team that accumulates the most points throughout the tournament winning the MacTier Cup. Therefore, no post-season is required. Every team plays five games, the western teams playing three at home and two away, while the eastern teams play a reversed schedule. There are no divisions or conferences.

The points system for the season is the same as most rugby competitions around the world:
 4 points for a win
 2 points for a draw
 0 points for a loss
 1 bonus point for scoring 4 tries or more
 1 bonus point for losing by 7 points or less

Awards
The Player of the Year award is awarded at the end of the season to recognize the best player that year. The award is decided by votes from all the coaches, as well as a Rugby Canada representative.

Broadcasting
The league had no deals with any networks; however, some teams provide live online streaming of their games. CBC Television aired the 2010 final live, but this was the only match shown on national television.

Teams

Champions 
The MacTier Cup was created in 1998 and awarded to the champion of the Rugby Canada Super League. Since the Super League folded, the MacTier Cup is now awarded to the Canadian Rugby Championship champion.

See also
 Americas Rugby Championship
 North America 4
 Rugby Canada
 Rugby union in Canada
 Rugby Canada Super League (defunct)

References

External links
 Official Website 
 ARC Official Website
 Rugby Canada Website

 
Rugby union leagues in Canada
Sports leagues established in 2009
Sports leagues disestablished in 2018
2009 establishments in Canada
2018 disestablishments in Canada